Sunny Side of the Street may refer to:

 Sunny Side of the Street (song), a 1990 song by The Pogues
 Sunny Side of the Street (Bryn Haworth album), a 1975 album
 Sunny Side of the Street (film), a 1951 comedy film directed by Richard Quine
 The Sunny Side of the Street, a 2006 John Lithgow album
 The Sunny Side of the Street (film), a 2022 film directed by Lau Kok-rui
Sunny Side of the Street, a painting by Philip Evergood
 "On the Sunny Side of the Street", a 1930 song and jazz standard written by Jimmy McHugh and Dorothy Fields